Alecia Nugent (born in Hickory Grove, Louisiana) is a country, Americana, bluegrass vocalist and musician.  Alecia has worked with bluegrass legend Carl Jackson on all of her albums.  Alecia was nominated for IBMA Female Vocalist of The Year in 2009.

Touring
Nugent performed in Scarborough, Ontario, Canada in 2008 as part of the Bluegrass Sundays Winter Concert Series.

Discography

Albums

Music videos

External links
Alecia Nugent Official Homepage
Myspace Page

Notes

American bluegrass musicians
American women country singers
American country singer-songwriters
Living people
1972 births
21st-century American singers
21st-century American women singers